"Lovers in a Dangerous Time" is a song by Bruce Cockburn, originally released on his 1984 album Stealing Fire. The song was a top 40 hit for Cockburn, peaking at No. 25 on the Canadian charts the week of August 18, 1984.

Background
According to Cockburn, the song was inspired by seeing teenagers expressing romantic love in a schoolyard. In the song, he contrasts the hopefulness and joy of new love with the despair of a wider Cold War world where notions of the future often carried a sense of foreboding and doom. However, especially in light of Cockburn's next single "If I Had a Rocket Launcher", the song has also been interpreted by listeners and critics as referring to the same Guatemalan refugee crisis that inspired the later song, or to the then-emerging HIV/AIDS crisis. Cockburn stated in later interviews that he was pleased by both of these alternate interpretations.

In 2005, "Lovers" was named the 11th greatest Canadian song of all time on the CBC Radio One series 50 Tracks: The Canadian Version.

U2 alluded to "Lovers" in their 1988 single "God Part II", with the lyric "Heard a singer on the radio late last night/He says he's gonna kick the darkness 'til it bleeds daylight."

Covers
"Lovers in a Dangerous Time" was covered by Dan Fogelberg on his album The Wild Places, which was released in August 1990 by Epic Records.

The song was subsequently covered by Barenaked Ladies on the 1991 Cockburn tribute album Kick at the Darkness. Released as their debut single, it became their first top 40 hit on the Canadian charts, reaching No. 16 the week of February 15, 1992. It also appeared on their greatest hits compilation Disc One: All Their Greatest Hits (1991–2001).

Additional covers have been recorded by Canadian singer Frazey Ford, Canadian duo the Royal Oui, and Oysterband.

See also
 Lovers in a Dangerous Spacetime

References

1984 songs
1984 singles
1992 debut singles
Bruce Cockburn songs
Barenaked Ladies songs
Dan Fogelberg songs
True North Records singles
Songs written by Bruce Cockburn
Works about the Cold War